Kabiezes is the northern terminus of line 2 of the Bilbao metro. It is located in the neighborhood of Kabiezes, in the municipality of Santurtzi. Construction of the station and the track between Santurtzi and Kabiezes began in 2009 and was delayed after a mudslide flooded the tunnel connecting both stations. It opened on 28 June 2014.

Station layout 

Kabiezes station follows the typical cavern-shaped layout of most underground Metro Bilbao stations designed by Norman Foster, with the main hall located directly above the rail tracks.

Access 
  64 Antonio Alzaga Av. (Antonio Alzaga exit)
  3 Lauaxeta St. (Lauaxeta exit, closed during night time services)
   68 Antonio Alzaga Av. (Antonio Alzaga exit)

Services 

The station is served by line 2 to Basauri with headways from five to ten minutes. Bus stops near the station are served by Bizkaibus regional services.

References

External links
 

Line 2 (Bilbao metro) stations
Railway stations in Spain opened in 2014
2014 establishments in the Basque Country (autonomous community)